Dato' Sri Hajah Siti Nurhaliza Tarudin  (Jawi: سيتي نورهاليزا بنت تارودين ;; born 11 January 1979) is a Malaysian singer, songwriter, actress and businesswoman with more than 300 local and international awards. She made her debut after she won a local singing competition show, Bintang HMI in 1995 when she was 16. Her debut single, Jerat Percintaan, won the 11th Anugerah Juara Lagu and another two awards for Best Performance and Best Ballad. Her debut album as of 2005 has sold more than 800,000 units in Malaysia. She has recorded and sung in multiple languages, including Malaysian, Minang, English, and Mandarin.

Throughout her career, Siti has received an unprecedented number of music awards in Malaysia and its neighbouring countries: 42 Anugerah Industri Muzik, 31 Anugerah Bintang Popular, 28 Anugerah Planet Muzik, 22 Anugerah Juara Lagu, four MTV Asia Awards, three World Music Awards, two Anugerah Musik Indonesia (Indonesian Music Awards), and five records in the Malaysia Book of Records. Having 22 studio albums, she is one of the most popular artists in the Malay Archipelago and Nusantara region – she has been voted for Regional Most Popular Artiste ten times in a row beating other fellow artists from Malaysia, Indonesia, and Singapore in the Anugerah Planet Muzik since 2001. Currently listed as one of Malaysia's richest, most-influential, most award-winning, and most single-produced artist. She is also one of Malaysia's best selling artists with her album sales having contributed to 10 percent of Malaysia's total album sales for 2001. To date, she has sold more than 6 million in record sales.

At international stage, Siti has won the Gold Award in Asia New Singer Competition at Shanghai Asia Music Festival in 1999, two awards from 'South Pacific International Song and Singing Competition 1999' held in Gold Coast, Queensland, Australia, and the Grand Prix Champion title in Voice of Asia in 2002 held in Almaty, Kazakhstan. In 2020, after receiving a record breaking of votes, she won the public choice for Adelaide Festival Centre's Walk of Fame 2019.

Besides musical awards, she has various other achievements. In 1998, Siti was chosen to perform during the closing ceremony of 1998 Commonwealth Games in front of Queen Elizabeth II and her consort, Prince Philip, among other dignitaries and officials from 70 countries including those from the Commonwealth of Nations. In 2005, Siti became the first Southeast Asian singer, and third Asian singer to perform a solo concert at the Royal Albert Hall, London, while being backed by the London Symphony Orchestra. She was listed second by MTV Asia in Asia's Best Musical Artiste and Channel V's Biggest Asian Artiste in 2005. Later in 2008, she was named as one of Asia's Idol by Asia News Network. She also has been listed as one of The Muslim 500 - The World's 500 Most Influential Muslims from year 2015 to 2022. Her success in the Asian region has gained her honorific titles including the "Voice of Asia" and "Asia's Celine Dion".

Early life
Siti Nurhaliza was born on 11 January 1979, in Berek Polis (police barrack) Kampung Awah in Temerloh, Pahang, Malaysia where she was the fourth child in a family of seven siblings to Tarudin Ismail, a police officer and Siti Salmah Bachik, a housewife. She comes from a musically inclined family; her brother, Saiful Bahri Tarudin, and her sisters, Siti Norsaida and Siti Nursairah are also singers. Her grandfather was a famous violinist, and her mother used to be a local traditional singer.

During her childhood, she was involved in various school activities including sports and co-curricular activities. She attended her pre-school at Tabika Perkep, Balai Polis Kampung Awah, Temerloh where she first showcased her early singing talent at the age of six when she sang "Sirih Pinang", a Malay traditional song, at her kindergarten's certificate-receiving event. She later attended primary school at Sekolah Rendah Kebangsaan Clifford and followed up her secondary education at Sekolah Menengah Kebangsaan Clifford, Kuala Lipis, Pahang. In 1991, when she was 12 years old, she won one of her earliest singing competitions, with the song "Bahtera Merdeka" at the Merdeka Day Singing Contest, a local patriotic song competition. During her schooling years, she was active in sports, especially in netball and this was evident when she participated in two different sports events – netball and 5x80 meter relay during the Fiesta Media Idola 2006 in Kuantan. She was also chosen as one of the torch bearers to light the games of the Fiesta, marking its opening alongside Malaysian actress, Fasha Sandha.

Coming from a poor family, at the age of nine, Siti had to wake up at 4:00 am to help her mother make and sell various homemade kuih in her neighbourhood, where sometimes, she also had to carry a makeshift table down three flights of stairs to the main road to set up a small stall. She commented that all the hardships have not only helped her to be more frugal when spending, but also to be more confident when communicating with the public. She also jokingly said that the whole experience has helped to improve her vocal skills as she has to shout to call for customers. Apart from participating in singing competitions, she also used to follow her uncle, Abdul Rahim Bachik, to invitational shows like wedding ceremonies and dinner parties, which have helped to expose her to performing live.

Although she has a good SPM results, Siti Nurhaliza decline to pursue her tertiary education to focus on her music career.

Career

Early commercial success (1995–1996)

Siti Nurhaliza's family performed at many public local ceremonies in their hometown, such as weddings and public soirées. At the age of 2, Siti began to learn traditional songs from her mother and went on performing the same music genre during special occasions and events.

She was also the vocalist for 'Family Group', a small band founded by her uncle, Abdul Rahim Bachik. She started to improve her singing skills by participating in numerous local singing competitions. When she was 14, she went for the audition for Asia Bagus but failed to go through. Despite her frustration, she did not give up. Two years later, she participated in 1995 RTM Bintang HMI competition at the age of 16 where she auditioned with a song made famous by Ruth Sahanaya, Kaulah Segalanya. In the competition, she met Adnan Abu Hassan, the music composer who tutored and helped her with her vocal performance, before she finally won the contest with the song by Aishah, Camar Yang Pulang. She signed a contract with Suria Records thus rejecting four other offers from different international recording companies, including Sony Music, BMG Music and Warner Music. In 1996, Suria Records released her first eponymous self-titled debut album, and the first single, Jerat Percintaan won the 11th Anugerah Juara Lagu In that year too, she won Most Popular Television Entertainer, Most Popular Female Singer, Most Popular Teen Artiste and the top award Most Popular Star in Anugerah Bintang Popular 1996.

Career development (1997–1998)
In 1997, Siti started to become a well-known figure in Indonesia's music industry when her story appeared in one of the most popular magazines in Indonesia, POS Kota, in April 1997's edition. She was taken as a formidable figure because it was difficult for foreign artists to break through in Indonesian's music industry if the artist has less to offer compared to their own artists. Siti was also said to be the first Malaysian singer to hold a live concert on Indosiar, a popular television station in Indonesia and it was televised nationwide. She has become one of the most influential artists in Indonesia which was evidenced by the series of big scale concerts she held in Jakarta, Bandung, Yogyakarta and many more cities over the next few years. She also won Best New Artist and Best Song (Jerat Percintaan) from Anugerah Industri Muzik 1997.

In 1998, at the early age of 19, she launched her own company on 12 January (one day after her 19th birthday), Siti Nurhaliza Productions (M) Sdn. Bhd. which acts as her official management team. Siti made her first and biggest appearance on the international stage during the 1998 Commonwealth Games which was held in Kuala Lumpur, Malaysia where she performed in front of Queen Elizabeth II and her consort, Prince Philip among other dignitaries and officials from 70 Commonwealth countries. She also shared the same stage with two international stars Céline Dion and Rod Stewart to entertain the crowd during the closing ceremony. The ceremony was televised in 70 nations worldwide, which led her to become known in the international arena for the first time. In November of the same year, she was invited to perform in Japan for five days at the Pop Queen Festival, also known as Saga Fiesta '98.

Early international stardom (1999–2005)

In December 1999, Siti received one of her first international winnings from an international singing competition when she took part in 'Shanghai Asia Music Festival 1999' that was held in China, where she managed to win the Gold Award for the Asia New Singer Competition. She was also invited in 2000 and 2002 for the same competition as featuring artiste. In the same year earlier in May, she took part in 'South Pacific International Song and Singing Competition 1999' held in Gold Coast, Queensland, Australia where she was crowned with the first place in the category of 'Pop/Top 40 for International Song' beating contestants from all over South Pacific through her single, We'll Be As One. Siti also managed to catch the juries' attention with her vocal prowess, that finally led her to be awarded with the Best Female Vocal Performance with the same single even though the single was judged by cassette tape/compact disc sent by her recording company to the organiser and not through live performance. For the next few years, Siti took part in 'Voice of Asia 2002' which was held in Kazakhstan, where she performed one of her singles from her third album, Purnama Merindu and managed to grab the Grand Prix Champion title, the ultimate prize.

In December 2003, she was invited to perform at 2003 Japan and ASEAN Pop Stars Dream Concert 2003 (J-ASEAN Pops 2003), held in Yokohama, Japan, alongside top Japan and ASEAN artists, including THE BOOM, You Hitoto, INSPi, Leonard Eto, Yuri Chika, Hiroshi Takano and Hideki Kurosawa from Japan. While ASEAN artists including Hans Anwar & Lo'Ryder (Brunei), Preap Sowat (Cambodia), AB Three (Indonesia), Alexandra (Laos), Lay Phyu & Iron Cross (Myanmar), Jolina Magdangal (Philippines), Tanya Chua (Singapore), Briohny (Thailand) and Lam Truong (Vietnam). For the concert, a special song was composed by a Japanese composer, Kazufumi Miyazawa with lyrics by a Singaporean lyricist, Dick Lee entitled, Treasure the World. The same song was also sung by each singer from each participating country in their native languages, where Siti's version which was in Malay, entitled Dunia Milik Kita was also performed for the first time during the event.

Siti was the first non-Chinese artiste to be invited to perform at the 15th Golden Melody Awards, Taiwan in 2004. Apart from performing solo with 征服 (Conquer) cover of Na Ying's single, she also sang a duet with Leehom Wang in a song called 月亮代表我的心 (The Moon Represents My Heart) which is a cover of the late Teresa Teng and as awards presenter alongside Taiwanese news anchor Patty Hou. She also appeared on a half-hour special program by Azio TV during her brief four days in Taipei. She also made her third appearance on MTV Asia Awards in 2004 held in Singapore, where she performed for the second time in a row for the ceremony with Gareth Gates, the runner up from the first series of England version of Idol, Pop Idol, in a song originally by Gareth's himself, 'Say It Isn't So'.

In 2004 also her company Siti Nurhaliza Production (M) Sdn. Bhd. (SNP) produced television programs. With the first musical program Muzikal Aidiladha (Musical of Eid Al-Adha) in conjunction with the Eid Al-Adha. After that, the company came up with the Siti Nurhaliza 3D (Siti Nurhaliza Dari Dalam Diri), a reality television series that exclusively reveal the private life of Siti Nurhaliza with 13 episodes and airing on RTM, a Malaysian public broadcasting network. In the same year also SNP produced Sukan dan Selebriti (Sports and Celebrities) programs involving the participation of popular artists and sports personalities in various fields with 26 episodes.

In 2005, she was dubbed as The Voice of Asia, when Alicia Keys first introduced her with the title during the MTV Asia Aid in 2005 held in Bangkok, Thailand due to her powerful vocal, and her outstanding achievements locally and internationally. In the same year, Siti held a successful solo concert at the Royal Albert Hall in London in April 2005, although the majority of the audience were Malaysians living in the United Kingdom, together with the local citizens. British press compared her performance to those by Celine Dion and cited her as Asia's Celine Dion for her powerful vocal and outstanding performances. During the concert, she was backed by the London Symphony Orchestra conducted by Indonesian maestro, Erwin Gutawa where the concert was even attended by the Sultan and Sultanah of Pahang and royal families from Brunei. In the same year, Channel V listed her as the Second Biggest Asian Artist for her achievements, trailing behind Taiwanese singer Jay Chou, who is on the top of the list. Coincidentally, MTV Asia also rated her as the Second Asia's Best Musical Artist, also behind the same Taiwanese artiste, Jay Chou.

Datukship and Transkripsi (2006–2007)

Siti's eleventh studio album, Transkripsi, was released in April 2006 and contained contributions from producers and composers from Indonesia like Erwin Gutawa, Melly Goeslaw and Glenn Fredly and Malaysians, like Aubrey Suwito, Cat Farish, Jenny Chin, Firdaus Mahmud, Mac Chew, Yasin and Damian VE. Transkripsi became the year's best album after winning the Best Pop Album and Best Album categories in the Anugerah Industri Muzik. It also received praises before by critics as one of her best albums ever produced and the album released was her debut attempt of producing an album under her own production company. On 24 October 2006, she was conferred as "Dato'" after receiving the title of Darjah Indera Mahkota Pahang (DIMP) from the Sultan of Pahang, Sultan Ahmad Shah on his 76th birthday alongside two Malaysian designers, Bernard Chandran and Dayang Tom Abang Saufi.

In 2007, she made her first appearance at the Grammy Award for the red carpet session on 11 February 2007 where she was the first Malaysian to walk the red carpet. On 20 and 21 April 2007, she performed at the Konsert Istana Cinta Nostalgia, which was a tribute concert for the late Tan Sri P. Ramlee and Puan Sri Saloma at Istana Budaya, Kuala Lumpur. The concert featured popular songs composed by Tan Sri P. Ramlee himself, performed by Siti and other invited artistes. Before this, Siti was also invited to perform a tribute concert for the late Sudirman Hj Arshad, also at Istana Budaya, Kuala Lumpur in 2002. On 30 April 2007, she garnered 4 nominations in the Anugerah Industri Muzik including Best Pop Album (Transkripsi), Best Vocal Female Performance in an Album (Transkripsi), Best Music Video (Bisakah) and Best Cover for an Album (Transkripsi). Out of the four nominations, she won two awards – Best Pop Album and Best Album for Transkripsi. She also received five nominations from Anugerah Planet Muzik 2007 for two categories that were voted by fans from Indonesia, Malaysia and Singapore – Most Popular Female Artist and Most Popular Song (Biarlah Rahsia) and three categories that were judged by professional juries and judges – Best Female Artist, Best Song (Biarlah Rahsia) and Best Album. She won three out of five – Most Popular Female Artist, Best Female Artist and Best Song.

Hadiah Daripada Hati, Lentera Timur and other works (2007–2008)

Siti Nurhaliza was the first Malaysian to be given the honour of walking up the red carpet meant for invited celebrities at the Grammy Awards held at Staples Centre in Los Angeles on 11 February 2007, after she won the two tickets as Best Dressed celebrity at Star World's "Breakfast With the Stars" in conjunction with the 78th Annual Academy Awards.
2007 also showed Siti's participation on soundtracks for films where she recorded two songs for two different films where she sang Menanti Pasti and Hati for Kayangan and 1957: Hati Malaya respectively. However, only the song Hati was included in her twelfth studio album, Hadiah Daripada Hati and also received the award of Best Original Theme Song from Anugerah Festival Filem Malaysia ke-21 (21st Malaysian Film Festival) in 2008. In the same year too she finally agrees to act in a production where she performed as Azizah, P. Ramlee's mysterious lover, in the musical 'Remy ... Kisah P. Ramlee (Remy ... The Story of P. Ramlee), which is a tribute to the late P. Ramlee, staged at Istana Budaya from 19 October to 3 November 2007.

On 10 December of the same year, Siti's twelfth studio album Hadiah Daripada Hati was released, with the Latin-influenced pop song Ku Mahu as the first single of this album and it was featured as the opening theme song for a local Malay drama, Spa-Q. Later, Melawan Kesepian was chosen as her second single and was the first track of this album to have a video clip. The song was a remake of a hit that was once popularised by an Indonesian band called Jikustik. Hadiah Daripada Hati came under criticism from the press when it was released. Critics said it was a moderate performance from her and was not on the same par as her previous album Transkripsi, which was touted as the best album she had ever made. But these criticisms were rebutted when Hadiah Daripada Hati received five nominations in the 15th edition of AIM including Best Pop Album, Song of The Year, Best Vocal Performance in an Album (Female), Best Arrangement and Best Album Cover making Siti the second nominee with the most nominations after newcomer Faizal Tahir. Out of five categories including three multiple nominations for Best Arrangement category, the album earned her three awards for Best Pop Album, Best Musical Arrangement in a Song (Malay) for the song Cintamu as well as her ninth Best Vocal Performance in an Album (Female) in which she had lost to Jaclyn Victor the previous year. Her acting debut in the musical 'Remy... The Story of P. Ramlee' also saw the debut of her third single Mulanya Cinta, which was composed by Dick Lee, a Singaporean composer. Siti has also become one of the most frequently searched persons on Google by Malaysian Google users, according to Google's 2007 Malaysia Year-End Zeitgeist, beating celebrities like Paris Hilton and Britney Spears.

In January 2008, she was cited as one of the Asia's Idols by Asia News Network for her exemplary achievements and gaining the status as the icon of Malaysian entertainment. and on 21 March 2008, Siti held one of her first solo acoustic concert at the Esplanade Theatre in Singapore. The concert was called Diari Hati – Dato' Siti Nurhaliza's Heart (Diary of Dato' Siti Nurhaliza's Heart) where she performed numbers of her hits from her latest album, Hadiah Daripada Hati and previous albums.

26 December 2008, was the release date of her 13th album, Lentera Timur, her most recent traditional contemporary album, Irama Malaysia (her fourth Ethnic Creative album) since her third one, Sanggar Mustika in 2002. She commented that the album has more modern and contemporary songs unlike her usual traditional genre. For that album, she worked with multiple international composers like Singapore's M. Nasir and Indonesia's Katon Bagaskara. Nine out of 13 songs (which all was created and composed under three days) that have been chosen came from a songwriting workshop, Cipta Ekspress – Berirama Malaysia. The event which was organised by Malaysian Authors Copyright Protection (MACP) was specially organised to find the materials for the album. Despite of the poor sale due to the lack of promotions, the quality of the album has never been denied where it was evident when during the 16th Anugerah Industri Muzik, Lentera Timur grabbed multiple awards including Best Pop Ethnic and later on honoured as Album of the Year in AIM 16. She also took home Best Female Vocal trophy for the song 'Di Taman Teman'. She was not present at the award ceremony however as she was away to Mecca to perform Umrah with her family.

Siti has also recorded two songs for the soundtrack for an Indonesian film, Perempuan Berkalong Sorban. One of the songs recorded is a cover of Opick's Ketika Cinta and also a new song, Batasku Asaku which was written by Siti herself. Both songs were included in her fourteenth album, Tahajjud Cinta.

In the same year, her wealth is said to have reached RM 50 Million by MTV Asia and was named one of the millionaires in entertainment in South East Asia.

SATU concert, Tahajjud Cinta and CTKD (2009)
On 15 February, her father, Taruddin Ismail, died at 11.50 am at the age of 67, after a heart bypass operation days before does not show any improvement, leaving seven children, and 10 grandchildren behind. She announced a 40-day state of mourning for her father and put singing activity on hold, except for Konsert Malam Sinar Maulidur Rasul 1430 Hijrah (1430 Hijrah Special Mawlid Night Concert).
Months after the loss, Siti went back to business where she announced her major three days concert at the Istana Budaya, SATU Konsert Eksklusif Dato' Siti Nurhaliza. It began its run on 26 June 2009 in Kuala Lumpur. The tickets were sold out weeks before the debut night. The concert received compliments from critics, and the show was attended by distinguished people such as region well-known artistes like Krisdayanti and Rossa from Indonesia to name some. A month before the concert, she won her ninth consecutive award of Most Popular Malaysian Artist of 2009 and also the Regional Most Popular Artist of 2009 from Anugerah Planet Muzik 2009, beating another 11 contestants where each country, Indonesia, Malaysia, and Singapore has four representatives based on SMS votes.

In March, Siti revealed that she would begin work on her next album later in the year. Apparently, the idea came about while Siti was taking part in an Erma Fatima theatre production, Sirah Junjungan. She also stated that, this will be her first attempt at spiritual songs and she plans to release the album for the holy month Ramadan of 2009 known as Tahajjud Cinta. In September, she became a host to 13 episodes cooking reality series Citarasa Selebriti Bersama Dato' Siti Nurhaliza with several guest artists. Later, Siti and fellow friend, Indonesian singer, Krisdayanti have planned to produce a duet album featuring eight duets where Siti will choose four Malaysian compositions while Krisdayanti will pick the other four from Indonesia. The album was released on 28 December in Malaysia and 27 January in Indonesia, under the name CTKD where it is an abbreviation with double meaning where it stands as the acronyms for the combination of both singers names, CT and KD, and also as the whole title of the album, which is Canda (Joke), Tangis (Cry), Ketawa (Laugh) and Duka (Sad).

In July, her skill as a former ambassador for the Malaysian Red Crescent Society was put to the test when she and a panel doctor of Media Prima performed a Cardiopulmonary resuscitation (CPR) on the late Yasmin Ahmad when she fell unconscious during a presentation in a meeting in TV3's headquarters and in August, Siti was given a privileged of her own channel on Astro at Channel 188, Channel Siti for 28 hours on 30 August 2009 which has broadcast her concert in June of the same year, SATU Konsert Eksklusif Dato' Siti Nurhaliza, her previous concert which was held at Bukit Jalil, the Siti's Fantasia Tour concert in 2004 and some of her music videos.

Bagaikan Sakti concert and SimplySiti (2010–2011)

In 2010, she performed at Konsert Bagaikan Sakti which was held in Esplanade – Theatres on the Bay, Singapore alongside Malaysian producer-composer-songwriter, M. Nasir which also was broadcast live through Astro Box Office Events (Channel 955) on 1 January, and the repeat show from 2 to 10 January. Her own company, Siti Nurhaliza Productions (M) Sdn. Bhd. has also produced a concert for two Malaysian award-winning artists, Faizal Tahir and Aizat Amdan entitled Konsert Satu Suara which was accompanied by Simfoni Orkestra Kebangsaan (National Orchestra Symphony) on 12 February until 14th at Istana Budaya. On 25 March, she received her first award of the year, Anugerah Artis Contoh HIP TV 2009 (HIP TV Role Model Artist Award 2009) defeating four other candidates based on votes from viewers through short message service (SMS). On 30 March, she launched her own beauty and cosmetic products under the name SimplySiti. The products underwent research and development in Korea, and are incorporated with Nanotechnology before receiving approval of Halal status by JAKIM. 6 days later, she received her 13th consecutive award of Penyanyi Wanita Paling Popular 2009 (Most Popular Female Singer 2009) and the overall category award, Bintang Paling Popular 2009 (Most Popular Artist of 2009) from Anugerah Bintang Popular Bintang Harian 2009 with votes from over 225 300 votes from the readers of Berita Harian. The latter one is her seventh time winning the same accolade.
On 21 April, Siti won herself another two awards based on popular votes through SMS service from Anugerah Pilihan Pembaca Media Hiburan (APPMH) 2009/10 (Media Hiburan Readers' Choice Awards 2009/10). She won the award for Artis Wanita Berkulit Cantik 2009/10 (Female Artist with a Flawless Skin 2009/10) and special piece of the ceremony, Anugerah Khas APPMH 2009/10 (Special Award of APPMH 2009/10). In addition, on 2 May, she won herself her sixth and seventh awards of 2010 from Anugerah Industri Muzik (AIM) ke-17 2010 (17th Malaysian Music Industry Awards 2010) where she won two vocal awards, Persembahan Vokal Terbaik Dalam Lagu (Wanita) (Best Vocal Performance in a Song (Female)) through her single, Ku Percaya Ada Cinta and Persembahan Vokal Berkumpulan Dalam Lagu (Best Group Vocal Performance in a Song) through her single, Amarah from her collaboration album with Indonesian artiste, Krisdayanti, CTKD. This is her 11th time winning Best Vocal Performance out of 17 years history of AIM, creating a record of her own. She also won another two awards from local fashion magazine, EH! voted by users through online and mail poles, Anugerah Stail EH! 2010 (EH!'s 2010 Style Awards) for the category of Selebriti Pencapaian Terbaik (Celebrity with the Best Achievements) and Selebriti Contoh (Role Model Celebrity) on 21 July.

Less than two months after being commercialised since late March, her skincare products range, SimplySiti received "The Best Halal Product" under Cosmetic category by Halal Journal Magazine. and on 11 January 2011, she received two awards from The BrandLaureate – Small and Medium Enterprises Chapter Awards (The BrandLaureate – SME's Chapter Awards), one for her SimplySiti range, for Most Promising Brand and another one for herself, first time introduced in 2011, The BrandLaureate Tun Dr. Siti Hasmah SME's Women of The Year 2010 which was presented by Tun Dr. Siti Hasmah, wife of Malaysia's fourth Prime Minister, Tun Dr. Mahathir herself. She also received Inspiration Woman Award from Association of Malaysian and Indonesian Journalists (ISWAMI) on 29 January.

SITI, All Your Love and History Channel (2011–2012)

In early 2011, she hosted her own talk show programme, SITI, which with 13 episodes, encompassing four main segments – V.I.P. Siti, Sentuhan Kasih (Caring Touch), Siti's Perspective and Siti's Symphony with the first episode aired on 12 February.

In early March 2011, she announced that she is working on her first full English album, entitled All Your Love which was produced by her own stepson's production team What's Up Entertainment, with all the songs written and produced by Australian singers, Christian Alexanda and Bryan Bouro and released on 26 September with her first English single, Falling in Love debuted at a concert in UiTM where she also expressed her interest to further her study in that university. Two out of ten tracks from the album, Remember You and I Wait Forever were a duet between her and Sean Kingston and Christian Alexanda respectively.

On 16 July, she won her tenth Regional Most Popular Artiste in a row beating fellow artistes from Malaysia, Indonesia and Singapore, thus setting a new record in the Anugerah Planet Muzik. However, this would be her last appearance in the category after the organiser has decided to drop her name from participating in the same category in the future. In September 2011, her company, Siti Nurhaliza Production (SNP) produced her first ever reality singing competition, I-Klon which was aired in November 2011. The aim of this show is to search for talents that not only can sing but also imitate their idol. On 17 October, she was reported to be working on her life documentary which was aired on History Channel on 11 January 2012 to coincide with her 33rd birthday.

On 28 January 2012 she received the Anugerah Ikon (Icon Award) by (APPMH) 2011/12 (Media Hiburan Readers' Choice Awards 2011/12) and on 8 April, she received a special award, Anugerah Seri Perak from Anugerah Bintang Popular Berita Harian in conjunction with the silver jubilee of the award in April 2012, which she previously had won the Anugerah Bintang Paling Popular (Most Popular Star Award) for seven times from the same ceremony. In April 2012, she accepted an offer to be featured in Sami Yusuf's latest album, Salaam for his song, You Came To Me which was recorded in three languages, Arabic, Malay and English. She also performed the song alongside him for his debut concert in Singapore, 'Konsert Salaam Sami Yusuf' on 8 July. A day later, on 9 July, she was given the chance to perform as the opening act and also the closing ceremonies of the 15th Malaysia Games or SUKMA XV on 16 July. Few days earlier, on 5 July, she received another award by EH! magazine for the award of Celebrity with Best Achievements for a second time since 2010.

In September, she announced a new album project with an Indonesian recording company, Virgo Records for Indonesian market where so far a number of Indonesian composers and lyricist have given their songs to Siti, including former lead vocal of Kerispatih, Samuel Simorangkir and Dewiq. The same album will also include a song written by herself and composed by a Malaysian composer, Aubrey Suwito. In the same month also, she received a special award by Anugerah Radio24 BERNAMA (BERNAMA Radio24 Awards) in the category of Entertainment Icon in conjunction with their fifth anniversary. And on 25 November, she was honoured with a special award of Anugerah Kesatria Puteri Kesenian from Puteri UMNO in their Himpunan Wanita Muda 2012 (2012 Female Youth Coalition). Two weeks earlier, on 11 November, she performed a 2-hour concert at Grand Ballroom, Bukit Gambang Resort City in Gambang, Pahang where it was attended by more than 5000 people including her fans from Indonesia and Singapore and the Sultan of Pahang, Sultan Haji Ahmad Shah. During the concert, she performed her latest single, Galau which was composed by an Indonesian composer, which will be featured in her latest project with Universal Music. After the concert, she announced that she will be start touring Indonesia from 8 December until 14 December in several major cities, including Jakarta, Pekanbaru and Banjarbaru. However, on 13 December, she has to call off her last destination tour for her husband was involved in a motorcycle accident in New Zealand. On 13 December also, she was announced as one of the finalists in World Music Awards 2012 alongside another Malaysian singer, Shila Amzah in the categories of World's Best Female Artist, World's Best Live Act and World's Best Entertainer of the Year. However, the awards ceremony was postponed from 22 December 2012 to a later date in 2013, due to logistic and immigration issues.

New image, Siti Nurhaliza in Symphony and Lentera Timur concert (2013)
On her 34th birthday, she has made a decision to fully observe the Islamic code of dressing for females by wearing a hijab at all times even when performing on stage. She also has commented that she will be taking a short break until April to take care of her husband who was involved in an accident in December 2012. In the same month, her company, Siti Nurhaliza Productions (SNP) was reported to be working on the second season of I-Klon, a reality singing competition, where it will be aired later this year after its debut in 2011. Later, in early February, she debuted her own 13-episode game show, Siti Ooo...Som where she co-hosted with Nabil Ahmad and Sharifah Shahira. The game show is basically divided into six main segments – Sepantas Kilat, Riuh Rendah, Siapa Hebat, Kebaboom, Siti Cabar and Huru Hara. Also, in the same month, she was revealed to be short listed for the fifth Shorty Awards in the category of Best Reality Star in Social Media where the winners were announced in New York City on 8 April 2013.

On 2 March, she won the Bella On-Stage Award, beating other nine contenders in the Bella Awards inauguration event for Malaysian women that have made tremendous achievement in the performing arts. On the same day, her cosmetic company, SimplySiti received a recognition from Malaysia Book of Records for the entry of Biggest Participation in Skin Transformation event in One Day. On 7 March, she was chosen to perform in collaboration concert between Malaysia and Indonesia, Konsert Nusantara at Istana Budaya alongside Hafiz Suip, Rossa and few other Malaysian and Indonesian singers. On 21 March, she was given a chance to perform a duet with Kenny Babyface through the songs Fire and When I Fall in Love for Sapurakencana Petroleum Malaysia Grand Prix Charity Gala 2013 which was attended by various international artists including Josh Hartnett, Teri Hatcher, Kimora Lee Simmons and many others. The charity event managed to raise more than RM 200 000 which will be used to aid heart patients.

In April, she announced that she will have her first solo concert at the Malaysian Philharmonic Orchestra for a 3-day concert from 5 to 7 July. In June, she received a special humanity award from Majlis Perundangan Pertubuhan Islam Malaysia (Mapim), for her effort and support of Mapim's Gaza fundraising. On 5 to 7 July, she performed at Siti Nurhaliza in Symphony – with the Malaysian Philharmonic Orchestra at Petronas Philharmonic Hall for three nights in a row in which tickets were sold out weeks before the said event. This was her first solo concert at the Petronas Philharmonic Hall where 12 years earlier she was only a guest performer at Tan Sri SM Salim's concert with the Malaysian Philharmonic Orchestra.

In August, she received Anugerah Artis Wanita Pilihan (Favourite Female Artist Award) from the inaugural Anugerah Melodi 2013 during a special Eid episode of Melodi where the winners were chosen entirely by the viewers. In the same month, she was also chosen as one of the 'Inspirers' for Akademi Fantasia 2013 students alongside Melly Goeslaw and Faizal Tahir where they will share their experiences as singers and motivate the students in their paths as new artists. In August also, she was chosen among few select Malaysian artists to participate in Konsert 'Harmony and Unity' on 25 August which was held at Dataran Merdeka, alongside few Indonesian artists, including Ahmad Dhani and Rossa which was aired on both countries television stations, TV1 and Indosiar respectively. In September, she was interviewed by National Geographic Channel for a special documentary in conjunction with the 50th Malaysia Day,  'Malaysia: Through The Decades' which was aired on 16 September, alongside Yuna, Lat and Malaysia's first astronaut, Sheikh Muszaphar Shukor for their insights on Malaysia and what it has achieved over the past 50 years. She was also revealed to be nominated in Anugerah Planet Muzik 2013 at Suntec Convention Hall, Singapore in three different categories – Best Malaysia Song, Best Duo/Group and Regional Most Popular Song which are all shared with Hafiz Suip for their collaboration in both artists' single, Muara Hati. And on 18 October, both of them were revealed to be the winner for two out of three nominations (Best Duo/Group and Regional Most Popular Song). Also, in the same month of September, she held her second major concert in 2013, Konsert Lentera Timur Dato' Siti Nurhaliza Eksklusif bersama Orkestra Tradisonal Malaysia at Istana Budaya, which was also her first traditional concert in 18 years of her career. Backed by 40 musicians from Orkestra Tradisional Malaysia, with 35 different traditional songs, ranging from Zapin, Samrah, Keroncong, Joget to few other traditional genres, the 2-hour concert was tentatively planned to be only for three days in a row from 20 to 22 September, before the fourth day, which is 24 September was added after receiving high demands from her fans and fans of traditional music to add another date to the 3-day concert. On 27 October, the concert was revealed as the most successful solo concert ever held at Istana Budaya, where it managed to collect more than RM 900 000.

In late November and December 2013, she was invited to perform for two international events. On 28 November, she was in Japan after receiving an invitation by the Japanese embassy in Malaysia for Asean-Japan Music Festival – Music for Healing after the Earthquake in commemoration of the 40th anniversary of Japan – Asean countries relationship, and as a musical appeal for relief aids for victims of 2011 Tōhoku earthquake and tsunami. During the festival, she performed a medley of songs that she personally had chosen – Biarlah Rahsia, Koibito yo (a Japanese song, made famous by Mayumi Itsuwa) and Nirmala in front of other representatives from both Japan and Asean countries and also the Japanese Prime Minister, Shinzō Abe who officiated the festival. Apart from local Japanese viewing, the festival was also made available for viewing for worldwide audience through NHK World. On 5 December, she was invited to perform at the 2013 Asian Television Awards at Resorts World Sentosa, Singapore, where she performed two songs – "Lebih Indah" and "On the Floor" where the show was broadcast for the first time to both STAR World and Channel V reaching audiences in Hong Kong, Indonesia, Malaysia, Philippines, Singapore, Taiwan, Thailand and Vietnam.

Where the Heart Is and Live in Singapore concerts, Icon of Malaysia and Fragmen (2014)

On 6 January, she announced the dates for her first charity concert, where proceeds will be channelled to her own charity organisation, Yayasan Nurjiwa (Nurjiwa Foundation), where it will provide aid to those who are in needs. Named "Dato Siti Nurhaliza Live in Concert – Where the Heart is", the two-hour concert was held on two consecutive nights, 8 and 9 February at Plenary Hall, Kuala Lumpur Convention Centre. On 9 February, it was revealed that the two-day concert managed to reach its goal by grossing more than RM 1 million, from ticket sales and donations from philanthropists alone.

In February, she announced a collaboration with Artelier Gallery Kuala Lumpur, in her continuous 2014 effort to raise funds for her foundation. With participation from 15 Malaysian, one Spanish and one Iranian painters, "SITI: An Iconic Exhibition of Dato' Siti Nurhaliza" was an exhibition of artworks and sculptures by the 17 painters and artists – their takes on how Siti Nurhaliza has inspired them. A month before the exhibition, every single painter and sculpture artist was given the opportunity to personally interview Siti before proceeding with producing their artworks based on their preferred materials and styles. The exhibition was opened from 27 February until 26 March. All the artworks were up for sale, where 30 percent of total grossed sale will be channelled to Yayasan Nurjiwa. The highest price goes to finger painting made by the Spanish painter, Andrian Torres, priced at RM 75 000.

Also, in February, she announced her first concert in Singapore which was performed on 12 April at The Star Theater after a six-year absence since her last solo concert in Singapore in 2008. The one-day concert, billed as  "Dato' Siti Nurhaliza – Live in Singapore" received positive reviews from local concert reviewers. One of the reviewers praised her ability to sound "flawless" while both singing and dancing at the same time.

Apart from the announcement of the concert in Singapore, also in the same month, it was revealed that she was chosen by David Foster as one of the guest artists in a one-night only "David Foster and Friends" show that was originally scheduled as the major event of Sapurakencana Petroleum Malaysia Grand Prix Gala Dinner & Concert 2014 on 27 March. However, due to the date's proximity to the Malaysia Airlines Flight 370 incident, the entire show was later revamped to become a full-fledged tribute concert. During the night of the show, she was accompanied by Foster on piano to perform two songs that Foster originally produced – I Will Always Love You and Because You Loved Me. Foster also accompanied Siti to Siti's own single, Seindah Biasa.

In April, she was honoured by Malaysia Book of Records as one of the recipients of "Icon of Malaysia". The same award was also conferred to other Malaysians who have achieved success in their respective fields – Dato' Jimmy Choo, Datuk Dr. Sheikh Muszaphar Shukor and Tan Sri Tony Fernandes.

On 30 June, she released her sixteenth solo album, Fragmen which was certified as Platinum, after more than 10 000 copies were shipped in less than two months. Two months later, on 17 October, Fragmen enabled Siti to win two awards from 2014 Anugerah Planet Muzik in the category of Best Female Artiste and Best Song (Malaysia) for "Lebih Indah". On 21 October, the Indonesian version of Fragmen was officially launched and released at Artotel, Central Jakarta with an additional track, a duet with Cakra Khan, "Seluruh Cinta". She also embarked on a 5-day promotional trip to Indonesia, where she participated in various Indonesian entertainment programs including on MNCTV, RCTI, Global TV, NET. and SCTV.

In November she won three different awards — "National Icon" from Inaugural Malaysia Women of Excellence Awards 2014 on 10 November, "Jewel of Muslim World" award from the Jewels of Muslim World Awards 2014 on 11 November and "Asian Music Legend" award from 2014 Top Asia Corporate Ball on 22 November. On 6 December, she won three awards out of eight nominations that she received from 2014 Anugerah Industri Muzik in the category of Best Album Recording for the album Konsert Lentera Timur (Dato' Siti Nurhaliza Bersama Orkestra Tradisional Malaysia), Best Vocal Performance in a Song (Female) for "Lebih Indah" and Best Album for Fragmen. Her winning for "Lebih Indah" marked the twelfth time she wins the category since she joined the Malaysian music industry.

On 18 December, she is one of the recipients of Anugerah Srikandi Negara from Peninsular Malay Students Federation (GPMS). Less than a week later, on 24 December, she was announced as the winner for three awards from 2014 World Music Awards – World's Best Female Malay Artist, World's Best Malay Live Act and World's Best Malay Entertainer.

Unplugged and Satu Suara, Vol. 2 concerts (2015)

During the New Year's Eve of 2015, she was in Singapore as one of the guest artists for the countdown of Celebrate SG50, which marked Singapore's 50 years of independence. 2015 also marked her twentieth year in the Malaysian entertainment industry since she won 1995 RTM Bintang HMI singing competition. To celebrate the anniversary, a special one night only acoustic concert was planned and organized on 7 April 2015 at Istana Budaya. Titled Dato' Siti Nurhaliza Unplugged 2015, tickets for the concert sold out days before the concert date and her vocal performances and overall concert received positive reviews from reviewers and critics alike. Present in the concert were people who have helped her throughout the years including her former mentor, Adnan Abu Hassan and former Prime Minister of Malaysia, Tun Dr. Mahathir Mohamad. Two months later, the concert was released in multiple formats including CD and DVD with three additional tracks accompanying the CD release of the Unplugged album. In conjunction with her twentieth year in the industry, a special tribute song was gifted to her by Era FM and Raku (a radio station subsidiary of Astro). Titled "Inspirasi" (Inspiration), it was composed by Faizal Tahir and sung by him and Hafiz Suip.

In August, she recorded and performed "Nenjae Ezhu", a song composed by A. R. Rahman – her first Tamil song for the opening performance of International Superstar 2015, an international Indian singing competition. In October, Siti was inducted in the 2016 edition of The 500 Most Influential Muslims. In the same month in Singapore, she shared an award with Cakra Khan from Indonesia in the category of Best Collaboration (Artiste) for their duet, "Seluruh Cinta" from the 2015 installment of Anugerah Planet Muzik. In the following month, she embarked on her second concert at Istana Budaya in 2015 on 7 and 8 November with Konsert Satu Suara, Vol. 2. Accompanied by Hetty Koes Endang (Indonesia) and Ramli Sarip (Singapore), the two-day concert was a commercial success, managing to collect more than RM 650 000 from tickets alone.

During the two-day concert, rumours of her pregnancy arose. While she refused to approve or disprove the rumours, she finally revealed on her personal Instagram account on 1 December that she suffered a miscarriage after two months of pregnancy. She commented in the post, "I don't want to deny the news of my pregnancy as this was a beautiful gift that I have been waiting for a long time...This gift was too new and fragile, I was just waiting for the right time". On the same day, she was revealed to be one of the top Asian artists in Malaysia on Spotify's annual Year in Music list. In the same month, she was invited to Indonesia as a guest judge for the Top 8 of Dangdut Academy Asia (D'Academy Asia), a Nusantara-wide dangdut singing competition featuring contestants from Indonesia, Malaysia, Singapore and Brunei.

Return after miscarriage, Dato' Siti Nurhaliza & Friends and new singles (2016)
2016 was a busy year for Siti as she was involved with a new business line, major concert, and multiple releases of new music. In January 2016, she returned to Indonesia as she celebrated her 37th birthday on the same day as she performed for Indonesian television station Indosiar's 21st anniversary, Konser Raya 21 Indosiar Untuk Indonesia. In March, after the success of Simplysiti, her own cosmetics and skincare line, she debuted the release of her own ready-to-wear fashion line for women, Creación by Siti Nurhaliza. In collaboration with Malaysian hijab brand Ariani and Malaysian textile company Jakel, she was involved heavily with the concept and design of the fashion line. On 2 April, she staged a one-night only Dato' Siti Nurhaliza & Friends Concert at Stadium Negara. Sponsored by Yonder Music and Celcom, the highly successful concert was attended by more than 7,000 people. Exclusive for the concert, she also debuted her digital duet "Memories" with American artist Whitney Houston. Throughout the entire two-hour concert, she sang over 20 songs and she was accompanied by both Malaysian and Indonesian guest artists including Anggun, Afgansyah Reza, Jaclyn Victor, and Faizal Tahir. Overall, Dato Siti Nurhaliza & Friends Concert received positive reviews and feedback from critics and concert reviewers.

On 20 June, she released "Hari Kemenangan", a special single for Eid al-Fitr, after her last in 2006. On 12 August, "Dirgahayu" her duet with Faizal Tahir was released. The song serves as the theme song for Lara Aishah, a 100-episode Malaysian adaptation of Mexican telenovela, La Loba. On 4 November, the song was included as one of the bonus tracks of Faizal Tahir's fourth solo album, Anatomi. Its music video premiered as the backdrop during their live performance of the song at the 22nd Anugerah Muzik Industri Muzik. During the 22nd Anugerah Industri Muzik on 18 December, she was the most nominated artist of the event with seven nominations in six categories. She was 22nd Anugerah Industri Muzik's biggest winner and her live album Unplugged and its singles enabled her to win several major categories including her first Best Nasyid Song with "Mikraj Cinta" and the fan-voted Choice Malaysia Singer. A single that was recorded as a tribute to her father, "Menatap dalam Mimpi" won Best Musical Arrangement in a Song and her thirteenth Best Vocal Performance in a Song (Female). She also won her seventh Best Album with Unplugged.

After receiving more than 300 songs submissions for her to shortlist and include in her new album since November 2016, SimetriSiti, her seventeenth solo album was released on 10 May 2017. Citing an estimate cost of RM100,000 to produce, the 10-track album featured collaborations with Malaysia rapper Joe Flizzow and Indonesian singer Judika.

First pregnancy, "Anta Permana", Asian tour and ManifestaSITI2020 (2017–2020) 
On 13 October, she revealed that she was four-month pregnant with her first child at the age of 38 after 11 years of marriage. She explained that the announcement is crucial to explain her inactivity few months prior and for her to focus on her personal life. A day later on 14 October, "Dirgahayu" was awarded Best Duo/Group from 2017 Anugerah Planet Muzik in Singapore. Few weeks later on 24 October, she was conferred by Sultan Ahmad Shah of Pahang the "Darjah Kebesaran Sri Sultan Ahmad Shah Pahang" (SSAP) and would be addressed with the honorific title of "Dato' Sri" henceforth. In November 2017, she was included in The 500 Most Influential Muslims for the third year in a row. In December, she was named Most Streamed Local Artiste in Malaysia by Spotify.

2018 saw the return of Siti to the music industry after a brief hiatus to focus on her pregnancy. On 5 March 2018, in anticipation of the birth of her first child, she released a special single, "Comel Pipi Merah". On 10 March, Malaysian animation concert Hora Horey Didi & Friends was released. It featured Siti playing new character "Mak Iti" who also sung "Oh Nana", a new song recorded by Siti for the animation. Nine days later on 19 March, she gave birth to her first child through caesarean section. A daughter, she was temporarily named Fatimah Az-Zahra after the daughter of Islamic prophet Muhammad. On 25 March, her daughter was officially named as Siti Aafiyah  which means to be safe and good in everything  during aqiqah and tahnik ceremonies at her home. After few months of professional break, she released a new duet single with Malaysian singer Khai Bahar in June 2018. A rerecorded version of "Comel Pipi Merah", "Cinta Syurga" is a slow song with added elements of Islamic zikir. Both versions of the songs were commercially successful. "Comel Pipi Merah" and "Cinta Syurga" were later certified four times platinum and gold respectively.

In late July, she revealed that she was chosen alongside Faizal Tahir as regular judges for the inaugural season of Big Stage, a singing competition for rising new Malaysian singers. Few days earlier, she was reported to be working on a new single that was written by Malaysian singer Hael Husaini for September 2018 release. On 21 September, she released "Anta Permana". A single with both modern and classical elements, "Anta Permana" was well-received and was certified 11 times platinum in less than a year of its release.  On 28 September, her duet with Indonesian singer Judika "Kisah Ku Inginkan" from SimetriSiti won Best Collaboration (Artiste) from the 2018 Anugerah Planet Muzik in Singapore. She returned to Japan on 4 October to represent Malaysia at the second ASEAN-Japan Music Festival. This was also her second appearance for the music festival after representing Malaysia for the same event in 2013. She was listed in The 500 Most Influential Muslims for the fourth year running in the same month. In early December, she was named Most Streamed Local Artistes in Malaysia by Spofity for second year in a row.

2019 continued to be a busy year for Siti as she was involved with local and international solo concerts, expansion of her cosmetics business, and multiple releases of new songs. Her live appearance on Malaysian television shopping program Go Shop on 6 January as spokesperson for cookware company Vantage set a new sale record for the program. In only two hours, she managed to sell 22,000 units of her special edition cookware etched with her signature for RM369 per unit. In total, she sold RM8 million worth of the special edition cookware at a rate of RM67,000 per minute. Five days later, her name and her birthday hashtag were trending topics among Malaysian Twitter users during her 40th birthday on 11 January. She was also honored by multiple Malaysian radio stations as they organized various special programs and segments to celebrate her birthday. First announced in December 2018, she embarked on Dato' Sri Siti Nurhaliza On Tour to Indonesia on 21 February, Singapore on 2 March, and Malaysia on 16 March. Citing production cost of RM10 million, it is the most expensive concert by a Malaysian artist. Her last stop for the tour in Malaysia at Axiata Arena on 16 March was attended by 12,000 people. "Ikhlas", a special Eid al-Fitr single featuring Siti with Indonesian singer Nissa Sabyan and Singaporean singer Taufik Batisah was released on 31 May. A special collaboration between Apple Music and Universal Music Malaysia, it is the first of its kind where singers from three countries sing together an Eid al-Fitr song.
On 10 July 2019, "Kasihku Selamanya", theme song to the romantic-horror film Dendam Pontianak was released. It only took Siti two hours to complete the recording of her vocals for the song. After almost 10 years in the Malaysian market, she returned to Indonesia to launch and promote Simplysiti on 8 August. In the same month, she reprised her role as a regular judge for the second season of Big Stage. In collaboration with Shopee Malaysia, she performed for Shopee X Simplysiti mini concert at Kuala Lumpur Convention Centre on 14 September where more than 1,000 fans were in attendance. During the mini concert, she also launched her first health drink Beausiti.

On 15 April 2020, Siti Nurhaliza launched a fund to aid frontliners and people affected by the coronavirus outbreak in Malaysia. The initiative is called Dana PKP (Peduli, Kemanusiaan, Prihatin) Siti Nurhaliza [Siti Nurhaliza PKP (Care, Humanity, Concern) Fund]. Siti said that the set goal will be increased and will go on as the Movement Control Order (MCO) is prolonged and different types of help will be given out. She is confident that everyone can help fight against the pandemic. The initiative is divided into three categories: Peduli (Care), Kemanusiaan (Humanity) and Prihatin (Concern). The fund is abbreviated as the Siti Nurhaliza PKP Fund. The Peduli (Care) category provides aid for facilities and equipment at hospitals that handle the pandemic. It also provides funds for the preparation of PPE, nose and mouth coverings, gloves and other equipment. Individuals and families who have lost their earnings including family members with disabilities or serious illness, will fall under the Kemanusiaan (Humanity) category. Last but not least is the Prihatin (Concern) category where for the month of Ramadan and Syawal, aid will be given to the underprivileged and charities. The newly launched fund has accumulated a jaw-dropping RM114,711 in just two weeks. In fact, Siti shared that the fund managed to raise RM78,625 in just five days and Siti's Live concert on YouTube, which aired live for almost two hours on April 18, managed to raise funds amounting to RM29,803.

Siti Nurhaliza's 18th studio album, ManifestaSITI2020 was released on July 3, 2020. Originally planned to be released in April 2020, the album launching was postponed due to the COVID-19 pandemic and nationwide quarantine to combatting the deadly coronavirus. ManifestaSITI2020 contains 11 tracks wherein 6 of them was released as singles earlier. The Malaysian music industry was revitalized when famed Malaysian music figure Dato Sri Siti Nurhaliza released her latest album titled ManifestaSITI2020 on 3 July amidst the Recovery Movement Control Order (RMCO). Her album received positive feedback from local music listeners and received a warm response for both digital platforms and physical album sales. The legendary singer also successfully held an online interactive concert ‘Manifestival Siti Nurhaliza x HotKool’ on 21 July 2020. Thanks to inspiration from previous concerts that were held in Korea and Thailand, the interactive 360-degree concert via Zoom is the first of its kind in Malaysia which also made Dato Siti Nurhaliza the first artist to be involved in a large-scale online concert.

Second pregnancy and recent development (2020–present) 

On 1 December 2020, Siti announced her pregnancy with a second child. The popular Malaysian singer took to Instagram on Tuesday to share the good news with her 7.9 million followers. In the post, which she wrote in Malay, Siti announced that she was four months pregnant. She included three black and white photos of herself cradling her baby bump. She later added that she underwent the same In-Vitro Fertilisation (IVF) procedure she did with her first child – daughter Siti Aafiyah. On the same day, Siti also announced her 2 new products, which are Beautéssence & BeauNest, which come under the BeauSiti X WonderLab collaboration via YouTube Live.

On 7 December, she was listed as the Forbes Asia's 100 Digital Stars Most Influential Asian Pacific Celebrities for her advocacy work during the Covid-19 pandemic alongside International Stars such as Blackpink, BTS, and Shah Rukh Khan. Forbes Asia's inaugural 100 Digital Stars List highlights 100 singers, bands, and film and TV stars from across the Asia-Pacific region who have taken the digital world by storm. In 2020, Forbes Asia gives special focus to celebrities who, despite cancelled physical events and activities, managed to remain active and relevant, largely by using social media to interact with their fans, raise awareness and inspire optimism. Many also used their influence to help worthy causes, especially those with a Covid-19 focus.

On 22 December, Adelaide Festival Centre announced that Siti would be one of the few international stars to be part of the Adelaide Festival Centre's Walk of Fame. The singer was selected among the eleven performers who performed at the centre last year after gaining the most online votes. This makes Siti the first South East Asian & Malaysian to have her name chosen for immortalization at Adelaide's Festival Center Walk of Fame.

On 11 January 2021, Siti, who is a mother of 1 and 2,  shared her IVF journey in a video titled Chapter 42: My IVF Story on getting her second child. The whole Vlog caught the attention of viewers as it shows the procedures that Siti underwent while pregnant with her second child.

On 18 March, in conjunction with Siti Aafiyah's third birthday (19 March), Siti, alongside Siti Nurhaliza Productions (M) Sdn.Bhd, Universal Music Malaysia, BeauSiti, Wonder Lab & Cuckoo, held an event called 2 Legacy. During that event, she had an early birthday celebration for her daughter and a few important announcements about releasing her first single called "Medley Klasik Siti".  At the event, Siti also received various awards from Universal Music Malaysia, which included a Gold Award for her SimetriSiti album, an 11 x Platinum Award (for Anta Permana single), a 4 x Platinum Award (Comel Pipi Merah single), a Gold Award (Cinta Syurga single), and a 2× Platinum Digital Award (Aku Bidadari Syurgamu single). Earlier this month, Siti also launched an exclusive new line of cookware called Vantage Siti Series 2021 and Siti Nurhaliza Special Edition Dinner Set under Siti Collection as Vantage Brand Ambassador.

On 1 April 2021, Siti Nurhaliza celebrated her 25th anniversary in the music industry with the hashtag JubliSITI25 and the tagline 25 Years of Siti Nurhaliza. The 42-year-old artist, who has released 29 albums in her 25 years as a singer, launched a new album that features children's songs, befitting her little one's arrival. The album features seven tracks with two additional lullabies. Six of the songs are traditional children's songs which have been re-arranged and will have slightly different lyrics. Among them are Bintang Kecil, Burung Kakak Tua, Buai Laju-Laju, Tepuk Amai-Amai, and Suriram. Some will be turned into medley numbers. Another track, Anakku Sayangku, has been adapted from Tan Sri P. Ramlee's popular tune, Anakku Sazali, and the album also includes two songs composed by Siti herself for her children, for Siti Aafiyah [2018] & "Anaknda" by Dato' Sri Siti Nurhalizafor Muhammad Afwa [2021]. Siti recorded the album over three days in early March 2021, with her pregnancy entering its 8th month.

Later on 3 April, Siti, who runs several businesses, including Siti Nurhaliza Production (M) Sdn. Bhd, Siti Nurhaliza Marketing Sdn Bhd, Siti Nurhaliza Collections Sdn Bhd, SN Mobile Digital Sdn.Bhd, Siti Sound Sdn Bhd, Simply SS Trading Sdn Bhd [SimplySiti], Creación By Siti Nurhaliza, BeauTyra, BeauSiti, BeauNest, BeauKids & CTDK Holdings Sdn Bhd and her own foundation called Yayasan NurJiwa [NurJiwa Foundation], Siti launches her own hijab label called AFIYA by Siti Nurhaliza with the collaboration of famous Malaysian fashion designer Dato' Jovian Mandagie. She said that The Afiya Label pays tribute to her first-born child, who she says radiates positivity, intelligence, elegance and above all. Siti later added that the label is said to be like a "fairy tale come to life" and a "dream come true" for Siti Nurhaliza. Siti & Jovian, along with her make-up line SimplySiti, launched a Jovian 3-Ply Disposable Mask CTDK Edition the day before she launched her hijab label, which are said to be high quality, eco-friendly, with a variety of other benefits.

Before Siti put her full focus on her second child, on 7 April 2021 Siti launched a limited edition gold wafer to mark her auspicious silver jubilee anniversary, which is a collaboration between CTDK Holdings Sdn Bhd, Simply SS Trading Sdn Bhd [SimplySiti], Siti Nurhaliza Production (M) Sdn. Bhd and the Malaysian Islamic Economic Development Foundation (YaPEIM) at the Islamic Arts Museum Malaysia.

On 19 April, Siti welcomed her second child through a caesarean section which she announced via her official Instagram. On 26 April, she reveals her son name as Muhammad Afwa officially which means Forgiving during aqiqah and tahnik ceremonies at her home.

On 29 May 2021, Siti Nurhaliza along with NurJiwa Foundation & CTDK Holdings, announce the launch of the NurJiwa Foundation & CTDK Holdings: Palestine and Covid-19 Special Aid Fund, which is the continuation and continuing efforts of the Siti Nurhaliza PKP Fund last year and now with the new fund name for the latest special assistance, namely the Palestine Special Assistance Fund and Covid-19.

The initiative is divided into three categories:

 Palestine — Provides emergency aid, welfare aid, humanity aid and development assistance to the Palestinians.
 Covid-19 — Provides special assistance that includes survival assistance to the frontliners as well as victims or families of Covid-19 victims who are facing financial problems etc.
 Others — Offers additional welfare assistance and current needs.

Artistry

Voice
Musically classified as a lyric soprano, she's one of Malaysia's best singers for winning 13 times the award for the "Best Vocal Performance in an Album/Single" from Anugerah Industri Muzik, Malaysia's equivalent of Grammy Awards.

Adjie Esa Poetra, an Indonesian vocal instructor described her voice as "She is very careful and never fails in the tone production and she's able to produce the most artistic and beautiful tone as possible.... In any songs, she can sing it with ease but powerful other than possessing more than four-octave vocal range."

M.Nasir, music critic and music composer has praised Siti's voice as saying, "When we talk about her, she is the voice...Give her any songs, she can deliver it very well and it is not a problem to find a suitable song for her." He further praised Siti for her brave efforts to experiment her voice melisma with new musics or songs.

One of her trickiest songs to perform is Kurniaan Dalam Samaran, a Japanese enka-influenced song where it requires her play of transition of alto to soprano vocal tones and she rarely performed it live. However, at her recent SATU concert, she performed it live, where it received appraisals from critics and fans where one of the reviewers cited her live rendition as, "The Japanese-flavoured song required her to switch from her natural voice to falsetto in a hair-raising cadenza somewhere in the absurdly high range most women vocalists would cringe from. But she pulled it off effortlessly, sending shivers down my spine."

Gareth Gates who has performed together with Siti during MTV Asia Awards 2004 when he was asked what does he think about Siti, he said, "She definitely has the looks and she certainly has the voice. If she continues to sing the way she does, she'll go really far."

Lea Salonga, Filipino singer and actress who has done various theatrical work, including Miss Saigon and several Disney's movies has also expressed her praise and respect towards Siti's vocal ability during her concert in Malaysia in 2010 where she sang one of the songs made famous by Siti and 2 By 2, Tiga Malam during the closing ceremony of her concert. In 2011, another Filipino artist, Gary Valenciano during his visit in Malaysia has expressed her admiration of Siti's vocal ability. He commented, "Based on what I've been told by the local media, I believe the best Malay song and the best vocal I've ever heard has to be Siti Nurhaliza's. If it was possible for me to meet her, I would definitely want to do a duet with her. If [I] were given a chance, I definitely want to compose a song for her, that is if she wishes."

Sami Yusuf who requested for her to be featured in his album, Salaam has commented, "Siti is not only has a good voice, but also has an interesting personality. She is a real woman that Malaysia and ASEAN should be proud of."

In 2013, an American singer, Kenny Babyface who did a duet with her during Sapurakencana Petroleum Malaysia Grand Prix Charity Gala 2013 has also repeatedly expressed his admiration towards Siti. He praised Siti for her "beautiful voice" and her great singing skills.

Influences
Growing up as a child, most of her time, she would perform traditional and classic Malay folk songs. However, she has been cited that her local idol and one of her greatest influences is Sudirman Arshad and also P. Ramlee whereas, her international idols would be Barbra Streisand, Celine Dion, Mariah Carey and Whitney Houston. In 2008, during Céline Dion's Taking Chances Tour in Malaysia, Siti was given an opportunity to meet her idol, where she also had given Céline one of her solo albums, Hadiah Daripada Hati complete with her signature.

Musical styles and themes
As a lyricist and record producer, most of her singles' lyrics revolve around the theme of love, although she has penned numbers of thematic single of spirituality and female empowerment. Several of her singles were written by her were targeted to a specific party – Biarlah Rahsia (Let It Be A Secret) was written with the allusion to the media who constantly investigate her private personal relationships and Cahaya Cinta (Light of Love) was written specially for her husband during her marriage in 2006.

Born and raised in a traditional musically inclined family, she has recorded five ethnic pop oriented albums – four solo studio albums and one duet studio album with Noraniza Idris. She has been taught on how to sing traditional songs by her own mother who herself is a folk singer. She has been promoting this genre of music on almost each and every major concert of her like when she did at her concert at the Royal Albert Hall, medleys of Malay folk songs and traditional music songs.

Public image

When she made her debut into the industry, she was often labelled as a penyanyi kampung (old-fashioned or conservative singer) for her modest attire and her refusal to take pictures with a man for a magazine cover, unless at a ceremony or at an award-accepting event. During her early years as a singer, she was criticised for refusing to wear daring clothes and her principle of not taking pictures with male artistes. She was quoted as saying: "As an artist, I do realize that there are many social responsibilities that I need to take care of. So, I opt to be moderate in everything, including in my sartorial matter." and "I want to show what my talent is, and my God-gifted vocal ability without relying [on the image] of being sexy.". Her debut in Indonesia in 1997 with modest, beautiful and talented personality has said to revolutionise Indonesian music industry which famous with Dangdut which before this promoted sensual and erotic elements through the performances, especially those by female artistes. Her modest image was the subject of appraisals and positive feedback even from the Islamic scholars from Malaysia and Indonesia. Since then, her popularity throughout the South East Asia music industry has remained strong, proven as she was voted as Most Popular Female Artiste ten times in a row and Regional Most Popular Artiste in 2011 in Anugerah Planet Muzik 2011, beating contenders from Malaysia, Singapore and Indonesia.

Her eastern image was also being cited as a good example for other artists to follow. In 2008, former State Minister for Youth and Sport Affairs of Indonesia, Adhyaksa Dault has advised Dewi Persik who is known for her open and sexy dancing movements to tone down her performances and follow the steps that Siti Nurhaliza has taken when venturing into the entertainment industry – "She's not over the top, she doesn't wear revealing clothes and doesn't dance sexily, but she's still able to be locally and internationally recognized".

She has been cited as an idol and as an inspiration by many Malaysian and non-Malaysian artists like Malaysia's Aizat Amdan, Misha Omar, Nicholas Teo, Soo Wincci, Singaporean Idol finalist, Maia Lee, Indonesian pop group vocalist, Sunu, from Matta, Judika and many others.

In 2007, her image likeness was used as part of the promotion by Malaysian Ministry of Tourism, Malaysia Windows Live Agent – Siti to attract more visitors from Japan. The cartoon is used in the Windows Live Messenger (formerly known as MSN Messenger) where it will provide information on attractive tourist destinations in Malaysia.

In January 2011, Siti was proposed as the cultural ambassador for Malay community by the Association of Malaysian and Indonesian Journalists (ISWAMI), based on both countries' communities acceptance of Siti's personality. ISWAMI chief believed that Siti may help ease strained relations should there be a crisis between Malaysia and Indonesia.

Other activities

Philanthropy

Throughout her career, she has been involved in a number of charity-related event, including organising charity concerts, open houses and launching her own charity funds. In March 2004, she launched Tabung Prihatin Siti, making her the first Malaysian artist to have a charity fund after her namesake whose aim to raise at least RM 50 000 for children's education and medical treatment. In January 2005, Nurhaliza donated RM 35 000 (about United States dollar11,000) to three different organisations for the 2004 tsunami victims before her concert at the Royal Albert Hall in April of the same year. A year later in February, she donated RM 500 000 for the National Anti-Drug Campaign where she was also appointed as the ambassadress for the campaign. Six months later, she and her husband founded Yayasan Nurjiwa (Nurjiwa Foundation) where the foundation served as a platform for people to help those in need through charity concerts and dinner events where the money will be donated to the selected organisations. In 2009, she and her husband donated RM 1.5 million to build a new mosque in Tikam Batu, Kuala Muda where the land was given as a wakaf by both of them and Siti's mother-in-law where before this, her husband has also donated a sum of money to build two mosques in Kuala Lumpur and Pattani, Thailand which finally completed in February 2011 and officiated by Sultan of Kedah, Tuanku Abdul Halim Muadzam Shah.

In 2011, Siti and her husband gave out an undisclosed amount of Zakat (alms) to more than 200 elderly people, single mothers and disabled people in Tikam Batu as part of their tradition apart from providing them with sarong, batik and some "Duit Raya" (pocket money during Eid al-Fitr) for the children.

Products and endorsements

With success in her singing career, Siti then got herself involved in business. She set up her own company – Siti Nurhaliza Productions (M) Sdn. Bhd. – with activities generally in the entertainment scene. She has four subsidiary companies, Siti Nurhaliza Collections Sdn. Bhd., Siti Nurhaliza Marketing Sdn. Bhd., Siti Sound Sdn. Bhd. and SN Mobile Digital Sdn. Bhd. She is also the president of her own cosmetic range company, Simply Siti Sdn. Bhd.

Siti sells her own tea, Ctea, brand of Malaysian tea, from tea cultivated on the foothills of Mount Kinabalu, Sabah. This Ctea brand comes in two flavours, Geranium Special and Pandan.

And now besides having her own products, she receives substantial income through commissions and royalties for her endorsements and as ambassador of products. She has been an ambassador and spokesperson for various international products – Jusco, Maxis, Maybelline, Minolta, Mitsubishi, Olay, Pantene, Pepsi, Samsung and TM Net.

Personal life

Relationship with Khalid Mohamad Jiwa

On 17 July 2006, after months of speculation by the media, Siti and her then-fiancé, Datuk Khalid made a press conference announcing that their wedding would be held on 21 August. Her plan to marry Datuk Khalid caused criticisms and uproar, since she was going to marry a 47-year-old divorcee with four sons where she was accused of causing his divorce. However, the issue was rebutted when Jabatan Agama Islam Selangor (Selangor Islamic Council) verified that Datuk Khalid and his former wife, Tengku Zawyah Tengku Izham officially separated in February 2004, after 15 years of marriage.

Some sources speculated that the total wedding cost was RM 12,888,888 (US$3,947,980 (adjusted to 2010 inflation)), however it was later denied by the couple and the wedding planner and stated that the total cost was roughly around RM 500,000. Her wedding dowry was revealed to cost at RM 22,222 and the hantaran (gifts from groom to bride and vice versa) cost around RM 30,000. The total sponsored items including Siti and spouse's jewelleries, dresses, etc., cost more than RM 9 million. Later, RM 1 million from the total price paid by TV3 to broadcast the whole ceremony was later donated to charity.
The engagement ceremony was held at Masjid Wilayah Persekutuan (Federal Territory Mosque) on 21 August 2006. The ceremony was also televised live and gathered more than 2 million viewers. The first wedding reception was held on 28 August 2006, at the Kuala Lumpur Convention Centre (KLCC). and was televised to 6.3 million viewers nationwide. The wedding also received coverage from Indonesia, where 10 Indonesian media representatives were there to capture the moment including Trans TV, SCTV and Jawa Pos. Photographed by celebrity photographer Kid Chan, it was a star-studded affair, with guests including royal families, VIPs, celebrities, close friends and family. Indonesian celebrities like Hetty Koes Endang and one of Siti's closest friends, Krisdayanti were given the opportunity to give a performance to the newlywed and guests. A second reception was held on 3 September 2006, in Siti's hometown of Kuala Lipis, Pahang where more than 10,000 people attended the ceremony including those from neighbouring countries. In the same year, the wedding charted as one of the 20 top celebrity weddings on Yahoo! Buzz. In 2011, her wedding was also listed in CNBC's "Asia's Most High-Profile Weddings", where her wedding was ranked in the top 5.

On 13 June 2010, Siti and her husband, Datuk Seri Khalid, was recognised by E! News Asia as the Third Most Powerful Celebrity Couple in Asia, behind Chinese entertainer couple, Simon Yam and wife, Qi Qi and Bollywood superstar couple, Aishwarya Rai and husband, Abhishek Bachchan.

In December 2015, Siti suffered a miscarriage two months into her pregnancy prompting her to share her difficult fertility journey with the public. In October 2017 after seeking longterm treatment at an Alpha Fertility Centre, Siti announced via social media live that she was expecting her first child with Datuk Khalid. Their daughter was born on 19 March 2018 via caesarean section. The new parents said they chose Monday as the delivery date for their first child as it coincided with the Prophet Muhammad's birthday. They named their daughter Siti Aafiyah Khalid. On 1 December 2020, Siti announced she was 4 months pregnant via her social media. On 19 April 2021, Siti gave birth to her second child, a son. They named their son Muhammad Afwa Khalid.

In December 2020, Siti as recipient for the homegrown Nona Superwoman Award, had mentioned that Khalid is the pusher in her success.

Controversies
Siti Nurhaliza and her husband Datuk Seri Khalid Mohamad Jiwa were issued a RM10,000 compound each for violating the Covid-19 standard operating procedure (SOP) during the tahnik ceremony for their second child. Selangor police chief Comm Datuk Arjunaidi Mohamed said Minister in the Prime Minister's Department (Religious Affairs) Datuk Dr Zulkifli Mohamad Al-Bakri along with Ustaz Azhar Idrus, Ustaz Don Daniyal and Ustaz Iqbal were also issued with RM2,000 compounds each. It was reported that police had earlier detected an article from an online news portal on the dissatisfaction of people online over the tahnik ceremony which was held at the celebrities' residence at Bukit Antarabangsa here.

Wealth
Siti is known to be a formidable and successful and well-known businesswoman in Malaysia. She currently tops the list of the 'Richest Artistes' in Malaysia. She is also reported to worth more than US$33 Million [RM 142 Million] as of 2022, enabling her to be named as one of the millionaires in entertainment industry, especially in the South East Asia region. As one of the most prolific artists in Malaysia, she is said to be paid RM 70,000 (US$16,728) for a 30 minutes show and RM 110,000 (US$26,287) for an hour show in also about RM 90,000 (US$21,507) for 4 songs show in 2019/2020.

Accolades

Discography

Malaysian/Indonesian discography
Studio albums
 1996: Siti Nurhaliza I
 1997: Siti Nurhaliza II
 1997: Cindai
 1998: Adiwarna
 1999: Pancawarna
 2000: Sahmura
 2001: Safa
 2002: Sanggar Mustika
 2003: E.M.A.S
 2004: Prasasti Seni
 2006: Transkripsi
 2007: Hadiah Daripada Hati
 2008: Lentera Timur
 2009: Tahajjud Cinta
 2014: Fragmen
 2017: SimetriSiti
 2020: ManifestaSITI2020
 2021: Legasi

English discography
Studio Album
 2011: All Your Love

Special album
Hari Raya album
 2003: Anugerah Aidilfitri

Duet albums
 1999: Seri Balas (with Noraniza Idris)
 2009: CTKD (with Krisdayanti)

Other
Malay, English and Mandarin compilation album
 2010: Siti & Friends

Concerts and tours
Malaysia
 1999: Konsert Live Siti Nurhaliza, Stadium Putra Bukit Jalil, Malaysia
 2001: Konsert Mega Siti Nurhaliza, Bukit Jalil 2001, Malaysia
 2002: Konsert Salam Akhir Siti Nurhaliza – Untukmu Sudir, Istana Budaya, Malaysia
 2004: Siti Nurhaliza Live in Concert 2004, Stadium Nasional Bukit Jalil, Malaysia
 2006: Konsert Akustik Siti Nurhaliza, Malaysia
 2007: Konsert Istana Cinta, Istana Budaya, Malaysia
 2009: SATU Konsert Eksklusif Dato' Siti Nurhaliza, Istana Budaya, Malaysia
 2009: Konsert Seribu Warna, Stadium Malawati, Shah Alam, Malaysia
 2010: Konsert SATU Suara, Istana Budaya, Malaysia
 2012: Dato' Siti Nurhaliza Concert Live in Kuantan 2012, Bukit Gambang Resort City, Gambang, Malaysia
 2013: Siti Nurhaliza in Symphony Live with The Malaysian Philharmonic Orchestra, Petronas Philharmonic Hall, Malaysia
 2013:  Konsert Lentera Timur Dato' Siti Nurhaliza Esklusif Bersama Orkestra Tradisional Malaysia, Istana Budaya, Malaysia
 2014: Dato' Siti Nurhaliza Live in Concert – Where The Heart Is, Plenary Hall, Kuala Lumpur City Centre (KLCC), Malaysia
 2015: Dato' Siti Nurhaliza Unplugged 2015, Istana Budaya, Malaysia
 2015: Konsert Satu Suara, Vol. 2, Istana Budaya, Malaysia
 2016: Dato' Siti Nurhaliza & Friends Concert, Stadium Negara, Malaysia
 2019: Dato' Sri Siti Nurhaliza On Tour Concert, Axiata Arena, Kuala Lumpur, Malaysia
 2019: Konsert Amal Orkestra Tradisional Malaysia bersama Siti Nurhaliza, Auditorium POWIIS, Prince of Wales Island International School, Penang, Malaysia
 2019: Shopee X SIMPLYSITI Mini Concert, KL Convention Centre, Conference Hall 1–3, Malaysia
2019: Karya Agung Pak Ngah (Datuk Suhaimi Mohd Zain) bersama Orkestra Tradisional Malaysia dan Dato' Sri Siti Nurhaliza

Singapore
 2000: Siti Nurhaliza Live at Harbour Front, Singapore
 2005: Siti Nurhaliza Live 2005, Indoor Stadium, Singapore
 2008: Konsert Diari Hati Siti Nurhaliza, Esplanade Theatre, Singapore
 2010: Konsert Bagaikan Sakti, Esplanade Theatre, Singapore
 2014: Dato' Siti Nurhaliza Live in Singapore, The Star Theatre, Singapore
 2019: Dato' Sri Siti Nurhaliza on Tour Concert, Singapore Expo, Singapore
 2020: Konsert Karya Agung Pak Ngah – Pak Ngah's Legendary Hits in Concert by Orkestra Tradisional Malaysia ft. Dato' Sri Siti Nurhaliza, Esplanade Theatre, Singapore

Indonesia
 2002: Konsert 1 Jam Bersama Siti Nurhaliza
 2003: Konsert Azimat Siti Nurhaliza
 2003: Konsert Special Siti Nurhaliza
 2004: Konsert Exclusive Melanesia - Siti Nurhaliza
 2004: Konsert Mutiara Negeri Jiran - Siti Nurhaliza
 2004: Siti Nurhaliza Indonesia Tour 2004, Indonesia
 2011: Charity Concert Banjarmasin, Indonesia
 2017: Golden Memories International Spesial Siti Nurhaliza
 2019: Dato' Sri Siti Nurhaliza on Tour Concert, Istora Senayan, Jakarta, Indonesia

Others
 2002: Siti Nurhaliza Live in Brunei, Brunei
 2005: Siti Nurhaliza in Concert, Royal Albert Hall London, United Kingdom
 2010: Siti Nurhaliza Live @ Alumbra, Australia
 2019: Siti Nurhaliza The Voice of Asia in Australia For One Night Only – OzAsia Festival, Festival Theatre, Adelaide, Australia

Filmography

Videography

Concert Albums
 1999: Konsert Live Siti Nurhaliza
 2001: Konsert Mega Siti Nurhaliza, Bukit Jalil 2001
 2002: Konsert Salam Akhir Siti Nurhaliza – Untukmu Sudir
 2004: Secretaries Week Celebration 2004
 2004: Siti Nurhaliza Live in Concert 2004
 2005: Siti Nurhaliza in Concert, Royal Albert Hall London
 2006: Konsert Akustik Siti Nurhaliza
 2006: Siti Nurhaliza in Concert, Royal Albert Hall London
 2007: The Best of Siti Nurhaliza – DVD Karaoke
 2009: Anugerah Aidilfitri – DVD Karaoke
 2014: Konsert Lentera Timur Dato' Siti Nurhaliza
 2015: Konsert Unplugged Dato' Siti Nurhaliza
 2018: Konsert Satu Suara, Vol. 2

Video Albums
 1998: CT Best
 1999: CT Best 2
 2000: The Best of Siti Nurhaliza
 2001: CT Best 3
 2001: CT Best 4
 2003: CT Best 5
 2003: CT Best 6
 2003: CT Best 7
 2004: CT Best 8
 2008: 2 Diva (with Krisdayanti)
 2009: Puing-Puing Cinta Vol.1
 2009: Puing-Puing Cinta Vol.2

Art exhibition
 2014: SITI: An Iconic Exhibition of Dato' Siti Nurhaliza

Written works
Apart from singing and hosting, she also has written numbers of articles in several newspapers and magazine.

See also
 Honorific nicknames in popular music
 Music of Malaysia
 Malaysian pop
 List of Malaysians
 List of Malays

References

External links

Siti Nurhaliza & SimplySiti Products Official Website

Siti Nurhaliza at Last.fm

 
1979 births
Living people
People from Pahang
Malaysian people of Malay descent
Malaysian Muslims
Malay-language singers
English-language singers from Malaysia
Malaysian world music singers
Malaysian women pop singers
Malaysian pop rock singers
Malaysian rhythm and blues singers
Malaysian dance musicians
Malaysian television personalities
Malaysian television actresses
Malaysian film actresses
Malaysian actresses
Malaysian socialites
Malaysian businesspeople
Malaysian women business executives
Malaysian women company founders
Universal Music Group artists
Sopranos
Companions of the Order of Loyalty to the Crown of Malaysia